Shweta Punjali is a Nepali musician, well known for her debut album Udaan a number of songs from which were nominated at various national music awards. She is also the winner of the Best New Talent award at the 2016 Nepali Music Video Award and was a nominee for Best Newcomer at the 2015 Tuborg Image Music Award.

She sings primarily Nepali Adhunik, a style of singing marked with traditional melodies from the South Asian nation but with an influence of western  instruments such as electric piano, guitar, violin and percussion. She also sings bhajan and Nepali classical songs.

Shweta was also a top contestant on a number of national music reality shows Nepali Tara (second season) and Bagina.

Singing style and training

Shweta Punjali iprimarily a Nepali Adhunik (Nepali modern/contemporary) singer and her songs generally use western musical instruments such as the keyboard, guitar, violin and percussion.

In addition singing in Nepali language, she also sings religious (bhajans) and classical Hindi, Bengali and Pakistani Punjabi and Urdu songs. She also sings western pop and indipop.

She has trained under the highly respected music teacher Gurudev Kamat at the Nepal Music Centre in both classical and contemporary styles of Nepali singing.

Career

Reality TV

Nepali Tara

In 2006, Shweta Punjali auditioned for, and was selected as a contestant for the second season of Nepali Tara. She progressed through the competition, reaching the top-20 and then top-10 stages. Until the top-10 stage, decisions on retention or elimination were taken by a panel of judges however, once reaching the top-10, these decisions were taken through popular voting sent in through mobile short messages (SMS).

Shweta was eliminated at rank 7, becoming just one of three female singers to reach the top-10 and the highest ranked female singer that year.

Her song, Ko Pase Chha, composed by noted musician Deepak Jangam and featured in the special Close Up Nepali Tara 2 - Top 10 music CD, was among the top most listened song for that season. While a contestant at Nepali Tara, Shweta performed in numerous Nepali towns and cities, including Pokhara, Dharan, Biratnagar, Butwal, Nepalgunj and Surkhet. She also performed at the finale for that season that saw Santosh Lama win the contest.

Bagina

Shweta was also a contestant on the Nepali classical music reality show Bagina in 2005. The show aired on Nepal's national TV channel, Nepal TV.

Singing

Debut album - Udaan

On 4 April 2015, Shweta Punjali launched her debut album Udaan (translated: Taking Flight) in the Nepal capital Kathmandu's Theatre Village. The album was launched by renowned singer Deep Shrestha and the event was attended by the who's who of Nepal's music scene.

The album was also simultaneously launched on iTunes Store, Google Play Music, Amazon Music, Spotify, Deezer and other online music stores. Udaan was also the first mainstream Nepali music album (fully produced in Nepal) to be released online to a global audience.

Udaan includes six songs, all of which are written by noted Nepali poet Durga Lal Shrestha and composed by master composer Nhyoo Bajracharya.

Several songs from Udaan have been nominated for top national music awards, including at the 2015 Tuborg Image Music Awards and the 2016 Nepali Music Video Award.

Shweta won the Best New Talent award at the 2016 edition of Nepali Music Video Award for her song Achamma Lagyo Malai from Udaan.

Second album

In October 2015, Shweta Punjali announced that she is working on her second album, which would include songs written by Durga Lal Shrestha and Nepali poet and philosopher Viplob Pratik, and music composed by Nhyoo Bajracharya.

Some of the songs featuring in this album include Aau Na Aau, Maile Palasha and Dekhnu Timilai.

Singles

Shweta Punjali has also released few singles by herself or in collaboration with other artists and musicians. Two prominent singles include: Sanchi Mero, a bhajan-inspired song, written by Ratna Shamsher Thapa and composed by Prabhu Raj Dhakal; and Ko Pase Chha, written Gita Pantha and composed by Deepak Jangam.

Concerts

In addition to performing at various towns and cities of Nepal, Shweta Punjali has also performed in Bangkok, Thailand and in New York City, Connecticut State, United States of America, and performed with musicians such as Nhyoo Bajracharya and singers like Babu Bogati.

Discography and awards

Documentaries and Films

Personal life

Shweta Punjali originally hails from the Nepali hill district of Arghakhanchi. She was born in Palpa and grew up in Pokhara and Bhairahawa before moving to Kathmandu for her master's degree at the Kathmandu University School of Management.

It was at this school that she met her future husband, Vibhu Mishra. They married in 2008.  The couple moved to Bangkok, Thailand, in May 2012 and from there to New York City, USA in June 2016. They have one son, Vivaan Ajay.

Vibhu also features in the music video of Shweta's song Bato Heri Rahechhu.

References

Nepalese musicians
People from Arghakhanchi District
Alumni of Kathmandu University